Genova is a surname. People with the surname include:

 Aglika Genova (born 1971), Bulgarian pianist and member of Genova & Dimitrov
 Giorgio Di Genova (born 1933), Italian art historian
 Jackie Genova (fl. 1980s), Australian-born exercise teacher
 Joseph diGenova (born 1945), American lawyer 
 Lisa Genova (born 1970), American neuroscientist and author
 Luciano De Genova (1931–2019), Italian weightlifter
 Nicholas de Genova (born 1968), American academic
 Peter J. Genova (born 1944), American politician
 Poli Genova (born 1987), Bulgarian musical artist

Italian-language surnames